Jovian is a 1982 video game published by Computer Shack.

Gameplay
Jovian is a game in which the player maneuvers carefully to avoid objects in space to make an attack against an enemy space station.

Reception
Dick McGrath reviewed the game for Computer Gaming World, and stated that "The game is definitely challenging and can become addictive I rate it a solid 8 out of 10."

References

External links
Review in 80 Micro
80-U.S.

1982 video games
Multidirectional shooters
TRS-80 games
TRS-80-only games
Video games developed in the United States
Video games set in outer space